Shirin Sharipov (born 18 December 1989) is an Uzbekistani Paralympic judoka. He represented Uzbekistan at the 2016 Summer Paralympics held in Rio de Janeiro, Brazil and he won the bronze medal in the men's 100 kg event.

He won the gold medal in the men's +100 kg event at the 2017 Islamic Solidarity Games held in Baku, Azerbaijan. At the 2018 Asian Para Games held in Jakarta, Indonesia, he won also the gold medal in the men's +100 kg event.

References

External links 
 

1989 births
Living people
Uzbekistani male judoka
Paralympic judoka of Uzbekistan
Paralympic bronze medalists for Uzbekistan
Paralympic medalists in judo
Judoka at the 2016 Summer Paralympics
Medalists at the 2016 Summer Paralympics
Place of birth missing (living people)
21st-century Uzbekistani people